Fiske is a surname of Scandinavian origins.

According to Burke's Peerage,  "The family of Fiske has long flourished in the counties of Norfolk (recorded as landowners in the Domesday Book) and Suffolk [in England], and derives from the old Norse name of Fiskr. Legend holds that they arrived with the invading forces of Olaf Tryggvason, King of Norway, at the Battle of Maldon on the Blackwater River in Essex in 991 A.D. Daniel Fisk, of Laxfield is mentioned in a document issued by King John, confirming a grant of land in Digneveton (Dennington), made by the Duke of Lorraine to the men of Laxfield 1 May 1208."

The name may refer to several people:

In arts and entertainment
Alexander Fiske-Harrison (born 1976), British writer
Alison Fiske (1943–2020), English actress, daughter of Roger Fiske
Frank Bennett Fiske (1883–1952), American photographer
George Fiske (1835–1918), American photographer
Harrison Grey Fiske (1861–1942), American writer
Irving Fiske (1908–1990), American playwright
Minnie Maddern Fiske (1865–1932), American actress 
Reine Fiske (born 1972), Swedish musician
Richard Fiske (1915–1944), American actor
Robert Fiske (actor) (1889–1944), American actor
Roger Fiske (1910–1987), English musicologist, broadcaster and author 
Willard Fiske (1831–1904), American librarian and writer
Lars Fiske (born 1966), Norwegian illustrator
 Anna Fiske (born 1964), Swedish illustrator

In law and politics
Bill Fiske (1905–1975), British politician
Fiske Goodeve Fiske-Harrison (1793–1872), British judge and politician
Robert B. Fiske (born 1930), American lawyer

In science and academia
Alan Fiske (born 1946), American anthropologist
Donald W. Fiske (1916–2003), American psychologist
John Fiske (philosopher) (1842–1901), American philosopher
Lewis R. Fiske (1825–1901), American university president
Susan Fiske (born 1952), American psychologist
Thomas Fiske (1864–1944), American mathematician
Willard Fiske (1831–1904), American librarian and writer

Places
Fiske, Saskatchewan, hamlet in Saskatchewan, Canada
Fiskdale, Massachusetts, a village of Sturbridge, Massachusetts, USA

In other fields
Amos Kidder Fiske (1842–1921), American journalist
Billy Fiske (1911–1940), American athlete and fighter pilot
Bradley A. Fiske (1854–1942), American admiral
Catherine Fiske (1784-1837), American school founder
Clive Fiske Harrison (born 1939), British banker
Solveig Fiske (born 1952), Norwegian bishop
Thomas W. Fiske (born 1954), American Episcopal Priest

See also
Fisk (surname)
Fisker (disambiguation)

References

Germanic-language surnames